Mónica Naranjo is the 1994 self-titled debut album from one of Spanish singer-songwriter Mónica Naranjo. Co-written with Cristóbal Sansano, who she would later marry and then divorce, it's a combination of soft rock ballads and flamenco-disco numbers, and includes the hit Mexican singles, "Sola", "Sólo Se Vive Una Vez", "El Amor Coloca", "Óyeme". The album sold 1 million copies in Mexico, having almost no sales in Spain.

Track listing

Sales and certifications

References

External links

1994 debut albums
Mónica Naranjo albums
Spanish-language albums